Early is a city located in Brown County in west-central Texas, in the United States. It is a suburb of Brownwood, and the population was 2,762 at the 2010 census. It is named for Walter U. Early, who donated land for the schools. It is home to the Early Independent School District and the Heartland Mall.

Geography

Early is located near the center of Brown County at  (31.744601, –98.941171). The Pecan Bayou, a tributary of the Colorado River, runs past the western end of the city, with the city of Brownwood on the opposite side of the river.

Demographics

2020 census

As of the 2020 United States census, there were 3,087 people, 1,107 households, and 765 families residing in the city.

2000 census
As of the census of 2000, 2,588 people, 980 households, and 752 families resided in the city. The population density was 1,008.2 people per square mile (388.8/km). There were 1,080 housing units at an average density of 420.7/sq mi (162.3/km). The racial makeup of the city was 94.17% White, 1.00% African American, 0.35% Native American, 0.58% Asian, 0.04% Pacific Islander, 3.25% from other races, and 0.62% from two or more races. Hispanics or Latinos of any race were 9.12% of the population.

Of the 980 households, 39.0% had children under the age of 18 living with them, 62.0% were married couples living together, 11.7% had a female householder with no husband present, and 23.2% were not families. About 20.5% of all households were made up of individuals, and 10.5% had someone living alone who was 65 years of age or older. The average household size was 2.64 and the average family size was 3.01.

In the city, the population was distributed as 29.3% under the age of 18, 7.3% from 18 to 24, 27.3% from 25 to 44, 21.9% from 45 to 64, and 14.2% who were 65 years of age or older. The median age was 36 years. For every 100 females, there were 92.6 males. For every 100 females age 18 and over, there were 87.5 males.

The median income for a household in the city was $36,150, and for a family was $44,861. Males had a median income of $31,902 versus $20,694 for females. The per capita income for the city was $18,755. About 11.0% of families and 13.5% of the population were below the poverty line, including 16.7% of those under age 18 and 3.5% of those age 65 or over.

Climate
The climate in this area is characterized by hot, humid summers and generally mild to cool winters.  According to the Köppen climate classification, Early has a humid subtropical climate, Cfa on climate maps.

References

External links
City of Early official website

Cities in Texas
Cities in Brown County, Texas